Veer-Zaara is a 2004 Indian Hindi-language romantic drama film directed by Yash Chopra and written by Aditya Chopra. The film stars Shah Rukh Khan, Preity Zinta, and Rani Mukerji, while Manoj Bajpayee, Amitabh Bachchan, Hema Malini, Boman Irani, Kirron Kher, Divya Dutta, and Anupam Kher form the supporting cast. Set against the background of India–Pakistan relations, it focuses on the titular star-crossed lovers—Veer Pratap Singh (Khan), an Indian Air Force pilot, and Zaara Hayaat Khan (Zinta), a Pakistani woman—whose love story spans across two decades amid trials and tribulations and the young lawyer Saamiya Siddiqui (Mukerji) who tries to help the couple. The soundtrack of Veer-Zaara is based on music by Madan Mohan, which was later revised by his son Sanjeev Kohli. The film was shot by Anil Mehta on sets that were designed by Sharmishta Roy and was edited by Ritesh Soni.

A major commercial success, the film emerged as India's highest-grossing film of the year, earning  in both India and abroad. The British academic Rachel Dwyer of the British Film Institute included the film in her "10 Great Bollywood Romance Films" listing. The film won 34 awards out of 92 nominations; the story, screenplay direction, performances of the cast, soundtrack, and the lyrical composition garnered the most attention from various award groups.

Veer-Zaara won the Best Popular Film Providing Wholesome Entertainment at the 52nd National Film Awards. It was nominated in eleven categories at the 50th Filmfare Awards, including Best Director (Yash Chopra), Best Actor (Khan), Best Actress (Zinta), Best Supporting Actor (Amitabh Bachchan), and two nominations for Best Supporting Actress (Dutta and Mukerji), and won four including Best Film. In the sixth iteration of the International Indian Film Academy Awards, the film received seven awards including Best Film, Best Director for Chopra, Best Actor for Khan, and Best Supporting Actress for Mukerji. Veer-Zaara also earned two Global Indian Film Awards, one Producers Guild Film Award, five Screen Awards, two Stardust Awards, and four Zee Cine Awards.

Awards and nominations

Notes

References

External links 
 Awards and nominations received by Veer-Zaara at IMDb

Veer-Zaara